The System/23 Datamaster (Model 5322 desktop model and Model 5324 floor model) was announced by IBM in July 1981. The Datamaster was the least expensive IBM computer until the far less expensive and far more popular IBM PC was announced in the following month.

Description

The Datamaster is an all-in-one computer with text-mode CRT display, keyboard, processor, memory, and two 8-inch floppy disk drives in one cabinet. The processor is an 8-bit Intel 8085 running at 4.77 MHz, with bank switching to manage 256 KB of memory. Available RAM was 64 KB (expandable to 128 KB), and the machine had 6 internal expansion slots. It could display 80 x 24 character text with 256 possible characters, similar to the IBM PC's Code page 437, on a built-in 12" green phosphorous CRT.

The intention of the Datamaster was to provide a computer that could be installed and operated without specialists. A BASIC interpreter was built-in to the system. IBM decided to merge the Datamaster's BASIC implementation with System/34 BASIC, which reportedly delayed the Datamaster by almost a year. A second keyboard and screen could be attached in an extended configuration.

Influence on later IBM systems
The familiarity the design group gained on the Datamaster project encouraged selection of an Intel CPU for the IBM PC. The delay caused by the decision to reuse System/34 BASIC in the Datamaster was one of the factors in IBM's selection of Microsoft BASIC for the PC (the other being the ubiquity of Microsoft BASIC on other home computers at the time).

A number of hardware components from the Datamaster were reused in the later IBM PC. The PC's expansion bus, later known as the ISA bus, was based on the Datamaster's I/O bus. The Datamaster's Model F keyboard with its 5251-style key arrangement was also reused in the PC, albeit with a serial interface (instead of the parallel one used on the Datamaster) and a new external housing.

From a software perspective, since the new IBM PC was using 8-bit characters, there were 128 new characters beyond the 7-bit ASCII characters which could be used. ASCII only defined the characters with numbers from 0 through 127, so the numbers from 128 to 255, which had the high bit turned on, were not defined yet. IBM’s design put serious characters there—three columns of foreign characters, based on their Datamaster experience, as described at Code page 437.

References

External links
IBM – System/23 Datamaster
The Old Computer Museum – IBM System/23 page

2999System 23
Computer-related introductions in 1981